4429 Chinmoy, provisional designation , is a Nysian asteroid from the inner regions of the asteroid belt, approximately  in diameter. It was discovered on 12 September 1978, by Soviet astronomer Nikolai Chernykh at the Crimean Astrophysical Observatory in Nauchnij, on the Crimean Peninsula. The likely S-type asteroid was named after Indian spiritual leader Sri Chinmoy.

Orbit and classification 

Chinmoy is a member of the Nysa family, one of the largest asteroid families and part of the Nysa–Polana complex with nearly 20 thousand identified members.

It orbits the Sun in the inner main-belt at a distance of 1.9–2.9 AU once every 3 years and 8 months (1,341 days; semi-major axis of 2.38 AU). Its orbit has an eccentricity of 0.21 and an inclination of 1° with respect to the ecliptic.

The body's observation arc begins with a precovery taken at Palomar Observatory in February 1954, more than 24 years prior to its official discovery observation at Nauchnij.

Physical characteristics 

Chinmoy has an absolute magnitude of 14.6. While its spectral type has not been determined, it is likely a stony S-type asteroid based on its membership to the Nysa family and its albedo (see below). As of 2018, no rotational lightcurve of Chinmoy has been obtained from photometric observations. The body's rotation period, pole and shape remain unknown.

Diameter and albedo 

According to the survey carried out by the NEOWISE mission of NASA's Wide-field Infrared Survey Explorer, Chinmoy measures 3.498 kilometers in diameter and its surface has an albedo of 0.229.

Naming 

This minor planet was named after Indian spiritual leader Sri Chinmoy (1931–2007). The official naming citation was published by the Minor Planet Center on 25 April 1994.

References

External links 
 (4429) Chinmoy, at astrode.de (2015), 
 (4429) Chinmoy, orbit at astronomia.zcu.cz
 Dictionary of Minor Planet Names, Google books
 Discovery Circumstances: Numbered Minor Planets (1)-(5000) – Minor Planet Center
 
 

 

004429
Discoveries by Nikolai Chernykh
Named minor planets
4429 Chinmoy
4429 Chinmo
19780912